Purna Kumari Subedi is a Nepalese politician, belonging to the Communist Party of Nepal (Maoist) who served as the vice chairperson of the Constituent Assembly. In the 2008 Constituent Assembly election she was elected from the Banke-4 constituency, winning 13884 votes.

References

Living people
Communist Party of Nepal (Maoist Centre) politicians
21st-century Nepalese women politicians
21st-century Nepalese politicians
Nepalese atheists
Nepal MPs 2017–2022
Nepal Communist Party (NCP) politicians
Khas people
Members of the 1st Nepalese Constituent Assembly
1958 births